This is a list of notable Jewish delis. A Jewish deli is a type of restaurant serving pastrami on rye, corned beef sandwiches, and other sandwiches as well as various salads such as tuna salad and potato salad, side dishes such as latkes and kugel, and desserts such as black and white cookies and rugelach, as well as other dishes found in Ashkenazi Jewish cuisine. Jewish delis may serve kosher or kosher-style food. In the case of kosher-style delis, they also offer dairy and meat together even though this is against Jewish dietary law. It is these Jewish delis which serve Reuben sandwiches and noodle kugel, among other dishes.

Ashkenazi Jews brought the deli to North America and most popularized it within American culture.

United States
 Ben & Esther's Vegan Jewish Deli

California
 Brent's Deli – deli in Northridge, Los Angeles
 Canter's – Fairfax district of Los Angeles
 Langer's Deli – Westlake, Los Angeles
 Nate 'n Al – Beverly Hills
 D.Z. Akin's Delicatessen – San Diego, California

Illinois
 Mannys Deli – Chicago
 Kaufman's Deli - Skokie, IL

Michigan
 Zingerman’s Deli – Ann Arbor

New York City

 

 Barney Greengrass – Manhattan
 Katz's Delicatessen – Kosher style deli in the Lower East Side, Manhattan
 Mile End Delicatessen – Montreal-style smoked meat in Boerum Hill, Brooklyn
 Russ & Daughters and their café and restaurant under the same name on the Lower East Side. The original location is an appetizing store.
 Second Avenue Deli – Certified kosher delicatessen in Murray Hill, Manhattan with a second location on the Upper East Side
 Zabar's – An appetizing store on the Upper West Side of Manhattan well known for its smoked fish and other deli items.

Oregon
 Kenny & Zuke's Delicatessen – Portland, Oregon
 Kornblatt's Delicatessen

Washington
 Dingfelder's Delicatessen, Seattle
 Zylberschtein's, Seattle

Washington, D.C.
 Loeb's NY Deli

Canada

 Dunn's – Montreal
 Chenoy's – Montreal
 Caplansky's Delicatessen – Toronto
 J&R Kosher Meat and Delicatessen – Montreal
 Main Deli Steak House – Montreal
 Schwartz's – Montreal
 Shopsy's – Toronto
 Wilensky's – Montreal

Defunct Jewish delis

 Bens De Luxe Delicatessen & Restaurant – Montreal. Closed in 2006
 Bloom's restaurant – London based deli with multiple locations. Last location in Golders Green closed in 2010.
 Carnegie Deli – Midtown Manhattan, near Carnegie Hall.  Closed since December 31st, 2016.
 Jerry's Famous Deli – Two locations in Los Angeles.  Closed in 2020.
 Lindy's – Two locations in Manhattan. The original one closed in 1969 and their second location closed in February 2018.
 Mort's Palisades Deli – A neighborhood fixture and Jewish deli located in Pacific Palisades, California, that closed in 2007.
 Reuben's Restaurant - Closed in 2001.
 Wolfie Cohen's Rascal House – A Jewish delicatessen located in Sunny Isles Beach, Florida. It opened in May 1954 and closed on March 30, 2008.

See also
 List of kosher restaurants
 Lists of restaurants
 Pastrami on rye – a classic sandwich made famous in the Jewish kosher delicatessens of New York City
 Save the Deli – a book about the decline of the Jewish delicatessen

References

Jewish delis
Retailing-related lists